Kox is a surname. Notable people with this surname include:

Arnol Kox (1952–2020), Dutch street preacher
Bodo Kox (born 1997), Polish film director, actor, and screenwriter
Daniel Kox (born 1952), Belgian cartoonist and comics artist
Killer Karl Kox (1931–2011), American professional wrestler
Norbert Kox (1945–2018), American outsider artist
Peter Kox (born 1964), racecar driver from the Netherlands
Tiny Kox (born 1953), Dutch politician

See also
Cox (surname)
Kokh Kox, the creator god of the Noon people
Koxbox, Danish psychedelic trance musical group formed in 1990